Eternal Allegiance is a 1926 German silent drama film directed by   and starring Otto Gebühr, Claire Rommer, and Paul Richter. It was shot at the National Studios in Berlin. The film's set's were designed by the art director Max Knaake.

Cast

References

Bibliography

External links

1926 films
Films of the Weimar Republic
Films directed by Heinrich Brandt
German silent feature films
National Film films
German black-and-white films
1926 drama films
German drama films